Hildebrand Wolfe Harvey CBE FRS (born 31 December 1887, Streatham, London, died Plymouth, Devon, 26 November 1970) was an English marine biologist.

Background
Harvey was the elder son of Henry Allington Harvey, a partner in the firm of Foster, Mason and Hervey, of Mitcham, Surrey, paint manufacturers, and his wife, Laetitia, who was a daughter of Peter Kingsley Wolfe and a descendant of General James Wolfe, hero of the Battle of the Plains of Abraham.

Education
After attending Gresham's School, Holt, from 1902 to 1906, he went on to study at Downing College, Cambridge, to read Natural Sciences.

War service
During World War I Harvey served in the Royal Naval Volunteer Reserve. He navigated minesweepers and patrol vessels.

Career
In 1921 he joined the Marine Biological Association in Plymouth as a hydrographical assistant. His early work was on the oceanography of the western English Channel.

In 1928 he published a monograph on the chemistry and physics of sea water, and in 1933 a classic paper on the rate of diatom growth. With three colleagues he wrote a seminal paper on plankton and its control. 

The National Marine Biological Library at the Marine Biological Association retain some of Harvey's scientific notebooks and records, including data sheets and notes on hydrographic observations.

Publications
Harvey's published work includes:
The Action of Poisons upon Chlamydomonas and other vegetable Cells (1909)
Note on the Surface Electric Charges of Living Cells (1911)
On Manganese in Sea and Fresh Waters
Hydrography of the Mouth of the English Channel (1929–1932) 
Über das Kohlensäuresystem im Meerwasser by Kurt Buch, H. W. Harvey, H. Wattenberg, and S. Gripenberg (Conseil Perm. Internat. p. l'Explor. de la Mer, Rapp. et Proc.-Verb. (v. 79, 1932)
Note on Colloidal Ferric Hydroxide in Sea Water (1937)
Note on Selective Feeding by Calanus (1937)
Recent Advances in the Chemistry and Biology of Sea Water (Cambridge University Press, 1945)
On the production of living matter in the sea off Plymouth (Journal of the Marine Biological Association, 1950)
The Chemistry and Fertility of Sea Waters (Cambridge University Press, 1966)

Honours and awards
In 1952 he received the Alexander Agassiz Medal of the United States National Academy of Sciences. In recommending the award, the Murray committee said:
H. W. Harvey has been the leading student for many years of the changes in the chemical constituents of sea water brought about through the agencies of plants and animals and also of how the availability of nutrient chemicals determines the fertility of the sea.

Harvey was also elected a Fellow of the Royal Society in 1942. His candidacy read:

 

Harvey was also awarded
Alexander Agassiz Medal, 1952
Commander of the Order of the British Empire, 1958

Personal life
In 1923 he married Elsie Marguerite Sanders, but they later divorced. In 1933 he married secondly Marjorie Joan Sarjeant, and they had one son.

References

English marine biologists
English ecologists
Fellows of the Royal Society
People educated at Gresham's School
Alumni of Downing College, Cambridge
1887 births
1970 deaths
Royal Naval Volunteer Reserve personnel of World War I
Commanders of the Order of the British Empire
20th-century British zoologists